Amata similis is a moth of the family Erebidae. It was described by Ferdinand Le Cerf in 1922. It is found in Kenya.

References

 

similis
Moths described in 1922
Moths of Africa